The Roman Catholic Diocese of Kwito-Bié is a diocese located in the city of Cuito in the Ecclesiastical province of Huambo in Angola.

History
 4 September 1940: Established as Diocese of Silva Porto from the Diocese of São Paulo de Loanda 
 16 May 1979: Renamed as Diocese of Kwito-Bié

Special churches
The Cathedral of the diocese is Sé Catedral de São Lourenço in Cuito, Bié Province.

Bishops

Ordinaries, in reverse chronological order

Bishops of Kwito-Bié (Roman rite)
 Bishop José Nambi (15 January 1997 – 31 October 2022.)
 Bishop Pedro Luís António (15 June 1979  – 15 January 1997)
 Bishop Manuel António Pires (16 May 1979  – 15 June 1979); see below

Bishops of Silva Porto (Roman rite)
 Bishop Manuel António Pires (23 September 1958  – 16 May 1979); see above
 Bishop Antonio Ildefonse dos Santos Silva, O.S.B. (3 November 1941  – 17 August 1958)

Coadjutor bishops
Manuel António Pires (1955-1958)
José Nambi (1995-1997)

See also
Roman Catholicism in Angola

Sources
 GCatholic.org
 

Kwito-Bie
Christian organizations established in 1940
Roman Catholic dioceses and prelatures established in the 20th century
Kwito-Bie, Roman Catholic Diocese of